Presidential elections were held in Abkhazia on 3 October 1999, alongside a constitutional referendum. They were the first direct presidential elections in Abkhazia, and resulted in a victory for incumbent President Vladislav Ardzinba, who ran unopposed.

Background
The previous presidential elections in 1994 had been indirect, with Ardzinba elected by the People's Assembly.

In August 1999 the Central Election Commission (CEC) headed by Viacheslav Tsugba set-up 28 electoral districts for the purpose of the elections.

Campaign
Incumbent President Ardzinba  was nominated by the national-patriotic movement Apsny, and also received the support of the Communist Party and the Abkhaz diaspora in Turkey.

On 2 September, the CEC registered the nomination of former Foreign Minister Leonid Lakerbaia by his People's Party. However, his candidacy was not approved. The CEC also denied registration to Yahya Kazan, who had been Abkhazia's representative in the United States, on the grounds that he had not lived in Abkhazia for the previous five years and that he did not have a working command of the Abkhaz language.

There were also rumours that former Vice Chairman Zurab Achba of Aidgylara would run for president, which he dismissed in an interview with Nuzhnaya Gazeta as a "nightmare of an idea".

Results

References

 
Abkhazia